Pory may refer to:

Pory Island, Mumbai
John Pory, English government administrator and writer
Robert Pory, archdeacon